The Aryan is a 1916 American silent Western film starring William S. Hart, Gertrude Claire, Charles K. French, Louise Glaum, and Bessie Love.

Directed by William S. Hart and produced by Thomas H. Ince, the screenplay was written by C. Gardner Sullivan.

Although Hart was assisted by Reginald Barker and Clifford Smith, he mostly directed the film by himself. Hart's combined salary as actor and director was $150 per week.

A partial print of the film survives in the Library of Congress, which was restored at the Museo del Cine Pablo Ducrós Hicken in Buenos Aires, Argentina.

Plot 

A hard working miner, Steve Denton (Hart), has become rich from years of prospecting. He takes his fortune and leaves to visit his ill mother, Mrs. Denton (Claire).

In the town of Yellow Ridge, however, he is detained by a seductive dance hall girl named Trixie (Glaum). Also known as "the firefly," Trixie not only cheats him out of his gold, but also conceals a message that was wired to him by his dying mother.

Learning the next day that his mother is dead, Denton is infuriated about being cheated and betrayed by Trixie, who pretended to be good, and other false friends. In his rage, he kills Trixie's lover, Chip Emmett (Mayall), and kidnaps her. Dragging her by the hair of her head, he takes her into the desert. Enslaving Trixie in his desert hideaway, Denton turns his back on "white civilization." He hates all white men and women and assumes the leadership of a band of Indian and Mexican bandits.

Two years later, a wagon train of Mississippi farmers who are lost and dying in the desert appeal to Denton for help. He refuses to assist them. He is secretly visited that night by Mary Jane Garth (Love), an innocent and virtuous young woman among the migrants who bravely confronts the Indians and Mexicans.

She pleads their cause and expresses her belief that no white man would refuse to protect a woman in distress. Deeply moved, Denton is redeemed. He guides the wagon train out of the desert and then resumes his wanderings.

Cast

Cast notes
Hart made these observations on his role as Steve Benton:

Production 
Hart was given a screenplay by the screenwriter C. Gardner Sullivan in which the hero had, according to Hart, "no motive for his hardness." He argued that the audience needed an explanation. Sullivan preferred the idea that his ruthless personality was simply a given, but eventually accepted Hart's wishes.

Although it was made during the silent era, Sullivan wrote long speeches for the actors to perform, which were filmed and later edited down.

Hart wanted Mae Marsh for the role as Mary Jane, but Marsh was working on a D. W. Griffith movie at the time. Griffith recommended a new actress, Bessie Love.

The movie was made at the height of Hart's career, but was unusual because he played a ruthless individual described as "hard as flint." As the title suggests, the movie draws on racial ideologies of the era. Hart stated that the central character, Steve Denton, was "a white man, who, foreswearing his race, makes outlaw Mexicans his comrades and allows white women to be attacked by them."

The film was made at Inceville and Sulphur Canyon.

Reception 

Contemporaneous reviews of the film were glowingly positive. The photography, acting, and direction were all positively reviewed. Hart himself believed this movie to be "one of the best Westerns ever made."

However, later assessments of the film have been critical of its treatment of race. Of the film, Andrew Brodie Smith wrote, "Racism was not new to the western but it had never been articulated in such a sophisticated fashion." Other scholars have labeled this as "perhaps the first film to openly proclaim the doctrine of White supremacy over Native American Indians".

See also 
 Racism in early American film
 Whitewashing in film

References 
Citations

Works cited

External links 

 
 
 

1916 films
1916 Western (genre) films
American black-and-white films
Films directed by William S. Hart
Films about race and ethnicity
Surviving American silent films
Silent American Western (genre) films
1910s American films
1910s English-language films